Walter Charles Moore (24 September 1875 – 12 May 1901) was an Australian rules footballer who played for Albert Park and South Melbourne in the Victorian Football Association (VFA) and for Essendon in the Victorian Football League (VFL). He served as a trooper in the Anglo-Boer War, but died of wounds after a battle.

He was the first Fijian-born player in the VFL/AFL and the first VFL player to die on active service in any war.

Private life

The third son (the sixth child of twelve) of George Moore (1843–1925) and Elizabeth Jane née Cazaly (1845–1924), Walter Charles Moore was born in Fiji on 24 September 1875.

His mother was the aunt of Roy Cazaly; making Moore Cazaly's cousin. His eldest sister, Edith (1868–1907), was married to Sir Francis Pratt Winter (1848–1919). Moore married Rose Alice Walters (1872–1924) on 9 May 1898 at Fitzroy, Victoria; they had one child, George Clarence Leonard Moore (1898–1967), born in Collingwood on  8 November 1898.

His father the Hon. George Moore, originally a soldier, worked as a government official in Fiji from 1872. In 1876 he was appointed as the first Government Surveyor; in 1880 was promoted to Staff Surveyor; and in 1899 he became the Commissioner of Lands, Works, and Water Supply, and the Crown Surveyor. He was awarded the Imperial Service Order for his service in 1903. At the time of Moore's death in South Africa, his father resided in Fiji, and his mother and sister lived at 46 St Vincent Place, Albert Park — the street surrounding the park in which a memorial to Charlie Moore would later be erected.

Footballer

Moore played for the Albert Park Football Club — and possibly the South Melbourne Football Club — in the Victorian Football Association before playing in the VFL. He made his debut for Essendon in the first season of the VFL, on 3 July 1897, against Collingwood at Victoria Park.

Although short (169 cm/ 5' 6½"), Moore played at full-forward for Essendon. At a time when a team's best goal-kicker usually played at centre half-forward, he was their leading goal-kicker in 1898 (his first full season), kicking 20 goals. In just 15 games, he came fifth in the competition's goal-kicking list. In three seasons he played a total of 30 senior games for Essendon, kicking 34 goals.

In the 1898 VFL Grand Final, Moore played against Fitzroy's Stan Reid, who would also die in the Boer War. Moore kicked one goal in Essendon's loss to Fitzroy:

Sportsman 

In addition to his footballing skills, Moore was also an excellent swimmer and a highly talented boxer. In the early days of his sojourn in South Africa, Moore showed off his sporting prowess by winning the Regiment boxing competition and being runner-up in the swimming competition:

Soldier 

According to a fellow trooper in South Africa, Moore was "university trained, gifted, and well fitted to lead men and gain respect from his comrades". Following the outbreak of the Anglo-Boer War, Moore enlisted in the Imperial Military Forces in the Fourth Victoria (Colonial) Imperial Bushmen's Contingent. The stated requirement for enlistment was that candidates must be capable horsemen, and  have a certain amount of bush experience. According to (Main & Allen, (2002), pp. 3,5), The Official Records of the Military Contingents to the War in South Africa noted that:

At the time of his enlistment, Moore listed his occupation as "chainman", which indicated that his work was with surveying teams in the bush, and, in particular, that he was responsible for the application of the Gunter's chain. Corporal Moore left Australia for South Africa on 1 May 1900, with the Fourth (Imperial) Contingent, under the command of Lieutenant-Colonel Kelly,

According to a fellow trooper, soon after Moore arrived in South Africa, he was demoted to Private for getting "too big for his boots", and having "looked upon the wine when it was red" On 12 May 1901, he was part of a reconnaissance squad patrolling in the location of the Toorberg Mountain above the Doornbosch Farm when they came across and engaged a group of Boers. In the ensuing battle, Moore's horse was shot out from underneath him, and he took cover behind the body of the fallen horse. He was then seriously wounded when a Boer bullet hit him in the waist, having passed through the body of the dead horse. Moore eventually killed his Boer opponent after eight shots, and had struggled back to a ridge and was crawling along it on his hands and knees when his mates found him. They took the gravely wounded Moore to the nearby Kwaggashoek Farmhouse. He died of his wounds that night; a contemporary South Melbourne newspaper claimed that Moore "was the first man of the Imperial Contingent to die of gunshot wounds".

He was originally buried near to where he died; his body was later exhumed and he is now buried in the Dutch Reformed Church cemetery, Somerset East, Eastern Cape, South Africa.

Remembered 

Charles Moore is commemorated on war memorials at:
 Charles Moore Memorial drinking fountain, St Vincent Gardens, St Vincent Place, Albert Park, Victoria, erected by public subscription.
 Boer War Memorial in Ballarat, Victoria.
 Memorial Shrine with drinking fountain and a lamp, at Bank Street South Melbourne; a memorial to the 140 residents of the City of South Melbourne who served in the Boer War in various contingents (includes a separate list of the eight of the 140, including Moore, who had lost their lives in active service).
 Australian War Memorial, Canberra, Australian Capital Territory.
 Albert Park State School.

See also

 List of Victorian Football League players who died on active service
 1898 VFL Grand Final

Footnotes

References

 Main, J. & Allen, D., Fallen — The Ultimate Heroes: Footballers Who Never Returned From War, Crown Content, (Melbourne), 2000. .
 Maplestone, M., Flying Higher: History of the Essendon Football Club 1872–1996, Essendon Football Club, (Melbourne), 1996. 
 Murray, P.L., Official Records of the Australian Military Contingents to the War in South Africa, (Melbourne), Albert J. Mullett, Government Printer, 1911.
 Nemaric, P., "Rupert Lowe, 4th Victorian Mounted Rifles", Sabretache: The Journal and Proceedings of the Military Historical Society of Australia, Vol.41, No.1, (March 2000), pp. 8–14.
 Rogers, S. & Brown, A., Every Game Ever Played: VFL/AFL Results 1897–1997 (Sixth Edition), Viking Books, (Ringwood), 1998. .
 Somerville, E.Œ. & Ross, M., Some Experiences of an Irish R.M., Longmans, Green and Co., (London), 1906.

External links

 Australian War Memorial Roll of Honour: Charles Moore (301)
 Australian War Memorial Boer War Nominal Roll: Charles Moore (301)
 The Heraldry & Genealogy Society of Canberra Inc.: Graves and Memorials of Australians in the Boer War 1899–1902: Melbourne, Vic, Albert Park (accessed 26 April 2008).
 "Club Honour Board", (Essendon Football Club website). Accessed 7 July 2014.
 AFL Statistics (Round by Round) — Essendon 1897
 AFL Statistics (Round by Round) — Essendon 1898
  AFL Statistics (Round by Round) — Essendon 1899
 Defending Victoria Website: 4th Victorian "Imperial" Contingent
 Australians in the Boer War, Oz-Boer Database Project, Full Record: Charles Moore (301)
 Cazaly Family Tree

1875 births
1901 deaths
Australian rules footballers from Melbourne
Australian Rules footballers: place kick exponents
Essendon Football Club players
Australian Army soldiers
Australian military personnel of the Second Boer War
Australian military personnel killed in the Second Boer War
VFL/AFL players born in Fiji
Fijian people of British descent
Fijian emigrants to Australia
Military personnel from Melbourne
People from Albert Park, Victoria